The Dortmunder Philharmoniker (Dortmund Philharmonic) are a German symphony orchestra based in Dortmund. The orchestra of the Theater Dortmund performs opera in the Opernhaus Dortmund and concert in the Konzerthaus Dortmund. The orchestra was founded in 1887 and has been shaped by conductors such as Wilhelm Schüchter, Marek Janowski, Moshe Atzmon and Jac van Steen.

History
The Dortmunder Philharmoniker were founded as Orchesterverein in 1887. They played at different locations until the Stadttheater was opened in 1904. Since then they played also opera.

The names of orchestra changed with organisational and functional changes, Hüttner Kapelle, Städtisches Orchester (Orchestra of the City), Philharmonisches Orchester der Stadt Dortmund, Philharmonisches Orchester Dortmund, now Dortmunder Philharmoniker. The concert venue after World War II was the Kleine Westfalenhalle. In 1966 they opened the new opera house Opernhaus Dortmund with a performance of Der Rosenkavalier, conducted by Wilhelm Schüchter. Its hall was also used for symphony concerts until 2002, when the Konzerthaus Dortmund opened as the orchestra's home.

As of 2010, the orchestra had grown to 102 musicians. The principal conductor has the title Generalmusikdirektor:

 1887–1919 Georg Hüttner
 1920–1951 
 1952–1962 Rolf Agop
 1963–1974 Wilhelm Schüchter
 1975–1979 Marek Janowski
 1980–1985 Hans Wallat
 1985–1990 
 1991–1994 Moshe Atzmon
 1996–2000 Anton Marik
 2002–2007 
 2008–2013 Jac van Steen
 since 2013

Music

In October 2006 they toured in China, in Shanghai and Beijing among others, conducted by Arthur Fagen.

In 2010 they participated in the Festival Klangvocal with music of Hans Werner Henze and Richard Wagner. Henze's Symphony No. 5, Wagner's Wesendonck Lieder in Henze's version, and the first act of Die Walküre were performed with soloists Angela Denoke and Stig Andersen, conducted by Jac van Steen. It is part of a project begun in 2009 to perform all symphonies of Henze, whose mother was born in nearby Witten.

The Dortmunder Philharmoniker recorded a CD in 2010, works of Antonín Dvořák, including his Symphony No. 6 and concert overtures.

References

Further reading
Bernhard Schaub: Sinfonie der Hundert. Porträt eines Orchesters, Harenberg Verlag, Dortmund 1997

External links
 

German symphony orchestras
Musical groups established in 1887
1887 establishments in Germany
Musical groups from North Rhine-Westphalia
Culture in Dortmund